Admiral Robert Stewart Phipps Hornby, CMG (9 July 1866 – 13 August 1956) was a Royal Navy officer who briefly served as Commander-in-Chief, North America and West Indies Station in 1915.

Naval career
Born the son of Admiral of the Fleet Sir Geoffrey Hornby, Hornby joined the Royal Navy in 1879 and took part in the bombardment of Alexandria in July 1882 during the Anglo-Egyptian War. In September 1901, he was appointed in command of the corvette , serving on the Australia Station. He was promoted to captain on 1 January 1903.

Hornby became involved in resolving the Sinai boundary dispute in 1906 and served in the First World War, initially commanding Light Cruiser Squadrons. In August 1914 he commanded the 11th Cruiser Squadron and then became Commander-in-Chief, North America and West Indies Station in February 1915 before reverting to second in command of that station in March 1915. He retired in 1922.

References

1866 births
1956 deaths
Companions of the Order of St Michael and St George
Royal Navy admirals
Royal Navy personnel of the Anglo-Egyptian War
Royal Navy personnel of World War I